Arrival were an English, London-based close-harmony pop-rock band, featuring singers originally from Liverpool. Following their appearance on Maynard Ferguson's 1970 UK television special and two chart hits, "Friends" and "I Will Survive", the band was booked to appear at the Isle of Wight Festival 1970.

After Arrival disbanded, its members joined other projects such as Kokomo, Olympic Runners and Gonzalez, and became session musicians or session singers.

Personnel
Dyan Birch - vocals (born Dyan Joan Birch, 25 January 1949 Liverpool – 10 October 2020)
Carroll Carter - vocals (born 10 June 1948, Liverpool)
Frank Collins - vocals (born 25 October 1947, Liverpool)
Lloyd Courtenay - drums (born 20 December 1947, Wallasey)
Don Hume - bass (born Donald Hume, 31 March 1950, Watford, Hertfordshire)
Paddy McHugh - vocals (born Patrick McHugh, 28 August 1946, Allerton, Liverpool)
Tony O'Malley - vocals, keyboards (born Anthony O'Malley, 15 July 1948, Bushey, Hertfordshire)
Glen LeFleur - drums, percussion
Raphael Pereira - guitar
Lee Sutherland - bass

Discography

Albums
Arrival (1970), Decca SKL 5055
Arrival (1972), CBS 64733

Compilation albums
The Complete Recordings of Arrival (February 2012), RPM D904 (double CD)

Singles 
"Friends" (January 1970) - UK No. 8
"I Will Survive" (June 1970) - UK No. 16
"Jun (So in Love)" (Japan only release) (August 1970), King Records
"(Let My Life Be Your) Love Song" (February 1971) (written by Jimmy Webb)
"He's Misstra Know It All" (October 1973), CBS (written by Steve Wonder)

References

External links
Arrival Discography at Discoogle
History at Alexgitlin.com

1960s establishments in England
1972 disestablishments in England
English rock music groups
Decca Records artists
Musical groups established in the 1960s
Musical groups disestablished in 1972
Musical groups from Liverpool